, also known as Tōkyō Taiikukan-mae, is a Tokyo subway station located in Sendagaya, Shibuya and Shinanomachi, Shinjuku. Situated on the Toei Ōedo Line, the station is operated by the Tokyo Metropolitan Bureau of Transportation.

Lines served
Toei Ōedo Line

Platforms
The station consists of an island platform serving two tracks.

History
The subway line began full operations on December 12, 2000.

Surrounding area

Sendagaya Station
Shinanomachi Station
Shinjuku Gyoen
Japan National Stadium
National Noh Theatre (国立能楽堂)
Hato-no-Mori Hachiman Shrine (鳩森八幡神社)
Meiji Jingu Skate, Curling Rink and Futsal Courts
Meiji-Jingu Stadium used by the Japanese baseball team Yakult Swallows
Chichibunomiya rugby stadium
Tokyo Metropolitan Gymnasium, known as Tokyo Taiikukan in Japanese
Keio University Medical School Hospital

Railway stations in Japan opened in 2000
Railway stations in Tokyo
Toei Ōedo Line